Heksegryta Peaks are a group of peaks rising between Belgen Valley and Tverregg Glacier, in the Kirwan Escarpment of Queen Maud Land, Antarctica. They were mapped by Norwegian cartographers from surveys and air photos by the Norwegian–British–Swedish Antarctic Expedition (1949–52) and from additional air photos (1958–59), and named Hekesegryta (the witch's cauldron).

References

Mountains of Queen Maud Land
Princess Martha Coast